Vladimír Dlouhý (10 June 1958 – 20 June 2010) was a Czech actor.

Selected filmography
 Kajínek (2010)
 Guard No. 47 (2008)
 The Conception of My Younger Brother (2000)
 Buttoners (1997)
 Give the Devil His Due (1985)
 Arabela (1980)  (TV series)

Awards 
 Czech Lion for best supporting actor (2008)
 Czech Lion for best supporting actor (2010)

Personal life 
His younger brother  is also an actor. Their paternal half-brother is Oliver Dlouhý. 

He died on 20 June 2010 after a long struggle with cancer. He was 52.

References

External links 
 

1958 births
2010 deaths
Male actors from Prague
Czech male film actors
Czech male television actors
Czech male child actors
Deaths from cancer in the Czech Republic
Czech Lion Awards winners